Renato Enrique Münster Gripe (Santiago, 28 December 1962) is a Chilean film, theater and television actor.

He graduated from the Liceo de Aplicación to later study at the Theater School of the Faculty of Arts of the University of Chile, with studies at the National Conservatory of Music as a flute interpreter. He has worked in theater and television in Chile and abroad and also as an artistic producer in theater, music and dance. He is the creator of the theater and audiovisual content generation platform Teatro Play www.teatroplay.cl, in which he develops creative solutions for the HR, Marketing and Internal Communication departments of all types of companies and institutions. He has starred in telenovelas such as Rompecorazón, A todo dar and Maldita and has a long time career in television.

Filmography

Telenovelas

References 

Living people
1962 births
Chilean male television actors
Chilean male film actors
Actors from Santiago
20th-century Chilean actors
21st-century Chilean actors
University of Chile alumni